As a nickname, Money may refer to:

 Money Hunter (born 1995), American football player
 Money Johnson (1918–1978), American jazz trumpeter
 Money Mark (born 1960), American producer and musician, best known for collaborations with the Beastie Boys
 Floyd Mayweather Jr. (born 1977), American professional boxer and promoter
 Bill Monroe (1900s infielder) (c. 1877–1915), an African-American baseball player in the Negro leagues
 Jeff Wilkins (born 1972), a former National Football League placekicker

See also 

Lists of people by nickname